The Subprefecture of Vila Prudente is one of 32 subprefectures of the city of São Paulo, Brazil.  It comprises two districts: Vila Prudente and São Lucas.

References

Subprefectures of São Paulo